Roland Chavigny (born 27 November 1950) is a French weightlifter. He competed in the men's lightweight event at the 1976 Summer Olympics.

References

1950 births
Living people
French male weightlifters
Olympic weightlifters of France
Weightlifters at the 1976 Summer Olympics
Sportspeople from Loiret